Costas Kadis is a Cypriot politician. He was the Cypriot Minister of Health from July 2007 to February 2008. He served as Minister of Education and Culture in 2014–2018, and as Minister of Agriculture since 2018.

Education
Kadis graduated from the University of Athens with a BSc in Biology in 1991.  He received his PhD from the same university in 1995.

References

Health ministers of Cyprus
Living people
Year of birth missing (living people)
National and Kapodistrian University of Athens alumni
Cyprus Ministers of Education and Culture
21st-century Cypriot politicians
Cyprus Ministers of Agriculture, Natural Resources and the Environment
People from Nicosia